is a Japanese actress and model from Fukuoka. Imada began her acting and modelling career in 2015 after being labelled “Prettiest Girl in Fukuoka” by a local advertising agency. Her acting big break was in 2018 when she was cast as Airi Maya for notable Japanese drama series Boys Over Flowers Season 2.

Filmography

Film

Television drama

Video games 
 Professor Layton and The New World of Steam (2023), Luke Triton

Other television 
 World Baseball Entertainment Tamacchi! (2018–19, Fuji TV)
Imada Mio no Prefere (2018–19, TV Aichi)

Web series 
#Koe Dake Tenshi (January – March 2018, AbemaTV), Megumi

Commercials 
Marinoa City (2013–2015)
Hiraki (2014–2016)
Fukuoka Prefecture, Yanagawa Tourism idols "Sagemon Girls" (2016)
Toogakuen High School (2017)
Aoyama Trading Co.,Ltd - Yofuku no Aoyama (2017)
Shionogi Health Care - Sedes (2017)
McDonald's (2017)
Asahi Wonda (2017)
Kyushu Electrical Safety Inspection Association (2017)
Dai-ichi Life - Just (2018)
SoftBank - Cyber Sunday (2018)

Music videos 
The Love – Hajimari no Uta (February 28, 2016)
Yoshitaka Taira – Hataraku Hitotachi
Generations from Exile Tribe – Namida (June 4, 2016)
Maco – Sweet Memory (November 9, 2017)

Dubbing 
Live-action
Men in Black: International, Molly Wright / Agent M (Tessa Thompson)
Animation
Lightyear, Izzy Hawthorne

Awards and nominations

References

External links 
 Official Website
 Mio Imada on YouTube
 
 Instagram

21st-century Japanese actresses
Japanese television actresses
Japanese female models
Actors from Fukuoka Prefecture
Living people
People from Fukuoka
1997 births